Kia ora is a Māori language greeting which has entered New Zealand English.

Kia Ora may also refer to:

Australia 

Kia-Ora, a brand of concentrated fruit drink developed in Sydney
Kia Ora, Queensland, Australia, a locality in the Gympie Region
Kia-Ora stud, a Thoroughbred horse stud situated near Scone in New South Wales, Australia

New Zealand 

Kia Ora, New Zealand, a locality in North Otago, New Zealand
Kia Ora FM, a radio station in Manawatu, New Zealand
The Kia Ora Incident concerning usage of the Māori greeting

See also
Keora (disambiguation)